The MRC Centre for Global Infectious Disease Analysis is a Medical Research Council funded research centre at Imperial College London and a WHO collaborating centre. It is part of the Department of Infectious Disease Epidemiology at School of Public Health within the Imperial College Faculty of Medicine.  Neil Ferguson is the director of the centre, along with four associate directors: Christl Donnelly, Azra Ghani, Nicholas Grassly, and Timothy Hallett. The centre also collaborates UK Health Protection Agency, and the US Centre for Disease Control. The centre's main research areas are disease outbreak analysis and modelling, vaccines, global health analytics, antimicrobial resistance, and developing methods and tools for studying these areas. The centre was previously called the MRC Centre for Outbreak Analysis and Modelling.

COVID-19 pandemic response 

The centre—together with the Jameel Institute for Disease and Emergency Analytics—formed the COVID-19 Response Team in respond to the COVID-19 pandemic. On 16 March 2020 the team produced a research forecast of various scenarios for spread of the disease in the United Kingdom and the United States. Without any mitigation their forecast showed local health care capabilities vastly overwhelmed by the epidemic wave. Periodic cycles of quarantine followed by softer social distancing were recommended, with quarantines in effect two thirds of the time. On 30 March, a study on 11 European countries was published. It provided estimates of the situation as of 28 March (observed and modelised with CovidSim), and projections for 31 March given current expectations, no action, and the difference. It also  provided a list of government policies and their respective absolute dates. As of March 2021, the COVID-19 Response Team has produced 43 reports.

See also
 Centre for Genomic Pathogen Surveillance

References 

Antimicrobial resistance organizations
Biological research institutes in the United Kingdom
Medical and health organisations based in London
Medical Research Council (United Kingdom)
Research institutes in London
Research institutes of Imperial College London
World Health Organization collaborating centres